Julian Argüelles (born 28 January 1966) is an English jazz saxophonist.

Coming to prominence in the 1980s and '90s with the ensemble Loose Tubes, Argüelles has worked extensively as a solo performer and with American and European musicians. His music combines British contemporary jazz infused with Spanish rhythms, South African grooves, brass band and classical influences. He was awarded a fellowship from the Royal Birmingham Conservatoire for his services to jazz in 2017 and received a Parliamentary Jazz Award (2016) for his album Let It Be Told.

Life and career

Born in Lichfield, Staffordshire, Argüelles was raised in Birmingham. He is the younger brother of the jazz drummer Steve Argüelles.

Argüelles started playing with big bands, including the European Community Big Band that toured throughout Europe. In 1984 he moved to London. He studied briefly at Trinity College of Music before joining Loose Tubes, staying with them for four years and recording two albums. In 1986 he received the Pat Smythe Award for young musicians. His first album, Phaedrus, included pianist John Taylor. The second, Home Truths, was a quartet which included Steve Swallow. As Above So Below was a large scale work for jazz and classical musicians with the 20 piece Trinity College of Music String Ensemble. The album evolved from a commission that was performed in Saint Wendreda's Church in March, Cambridgeshire in the Fens.

He was commissioned by BBC Radio 3 to write 60 minutes of music for an octet. It was performed and recorded at Bath International Music Festival in May 1996. The group toured and recorded the album Skull View, released in 1997 by Babel Label. His second octet album, Escapade, was released by Provocateur. Argüelles has been commissioned to write and arrange for HR Frankfurt, Phronesis, Scottish National Jazz Orchestra, Apollo Saxophone Quartet, his octet (by Birmingham Jazz), Berkshire Youth Jazz Orchestra, Walsall Youth Jazz Orchestra, Fenland Youth Symphony Orchestra, North German Radio Big Band (NDR), and Royal Academy of Music. In 1999 he received the Jazz Composers Alliance Composition Award from the U.S.

He has worked with Archie Shepp, Tim Berne, Hermeto Pascoal, John Abercrombie, Dave Holland, Peter Erskine, Chris McGregor, Evan Parker, Mike Gibbs, John Scofield, Carla Bley, Dudu Pukwana, Arturo Sandoval, and Giorgio Gaslini. He was also a member of several big bands including The HR in Frankfurt, Kenny Wheeler Big Band, Django Bates' Delightful Precipice, and Colin Towns' Mask Orchestra.

He has taught at the KUG Jazz Institute in Graz, Austria, York University, Royal Academy of Music, and Guildhall School of Music and Drama. He has also taught at summer schools such as Glamorgan Jazz School, Edinburgh and Manchester summer schools, and the Royal Conservatory, Den Haag.

Discography

As leader
 Phaedrus (Ah Um, 1990)
 Home Truths (Babel, 1995)
 Scapes (Babel, 1996)
 Skull View (Babel, 1997)
 Escapade (Provocateur, 1999)
 As Above So Below (Provocateur, 2003)
 Partita (Basho, 2006)
 Momenta (Basho, 2009)
 Inner Voices (Tone of a Pitch, 2009)
 Circularity (CAM Jazz, 2014)
 Let It Be Told (Basho, 2015)
 Tetra (Whirlwind, 2015)
 The Behemoth (Edition, 2017)
 Setembro (Edition, 2017)
 Tonadas (Edition, 2018)

As sideman
With Django Bates
 Summer Fruits (and Unrest) (JMT, 1993)
 Winter Truce (and Homes Blaze) (JMT, 1995)

With Carla Bley
 Big Band Theory (1993)
 The Carla Bley Big Band Goes to Church (1996)

With Andy Sheppard
 Rhythm Method (Blue Note International, 1993)

With Loose Tubes
 Delightful Precipice (1986)
 Open Letter (1988)

With Kenny Wheeler
 The Long Waiting (2012)
With Samo Salamon
 Nano (Goga, 2006)
 Unity (Samo Records, 2016)
 The Colours Suite (Clean Feed Records, 2017)

References

External links 
 Official site

1966 births
Living people
People from Lichfield
21st-century British male musicians
21st-century saxophonists
British male saxophonists
English jazz composers
English jazz saxophonists
English male composers
Jazz baritone saxophonists
Jazz soprano saxophonists
Jazz tenor saxophonists
Male jazz composers
Delightful Precipice members
Human Chain members
Loose Tubes members
National Youth Jazz Orchestra members
Edition Records artists
Basho Records artists
Whirlwind Recordings artists